Device for Connection of Luminaires (DCL) is a European standard for ceiling light fixtures introduced in 2005 and refined in 2009. It uses 6 ampere. DCL must carry the CE marking as per the Low Voltage Directive. DCL is only allowed to be installed with ground.

Adoption

External links 
 

2005 introductions
Electrical power connectors
EN standards
61995